Last Mission is a top-down multidirectional shooter developed by Data East and distributed in worldwide release for the arcades in 1986. The game is similar to Time Pilot as players have full movement control over their ship and can move it in all eight directions.

Plot
The players assume the role of an alien-humanoid space pilot who has been exiled from their home galaxy for committing an unlearned crime. The only way the player character can return is to restore their honor; the only way to do so is to invade and defeat the alien invaders who have been known to frequently attack the player character's people using a ship called the Main Fighter.

Reception 
In Japan, Game Machine listed Last Mission on their December 1, 1986 issue as being the fourth most-successful table arcade unit of the month.

References

External links
Last Mission at arcade-history

1986 video games
Arcade video games
Data East video games
Commodore 64 games
U.S. Gold games
ZX Spectrum games
Video games developed in Japan
Video games scored by David Whittaker
Multidirectional shooters
Data East arcade games